Soavinandriana is a town and commune in Madagascar. It belongs to the district of Soavinandriana, which is a part of Itasy Region. The population of the commune was 40,045 in 2018.

Only primary schooling is available. The majority 99% of the population of the commune are farmers.  The most important crop is rice, while other important products are maize, cassava and tobacco. Services provide employment for 1% of the population.

Tobacco is an important factor of the local community.

Roads
It is localized on the National Road 43, about 75 km from the capital Antananarivo.

Nature
The Ramanavy forest (Forêt de Ramanavy, or translated: Bats Forest) at 10km from Soavinandriana, that hosts some 20 endemic species of plants.

References 

Tobacco in Madagascar
Populated places in Itasy Region